This is a list of oil refineries. Oil & Gas Journal publishes a worldwide list of refineries annually in a country-by-country tabulation that includes for each refinery: location, crude oil daily processing capacity, and the size of each process unit in the refinery. For some countries, the refinery list is further categorized state-by-state. The list appears in one of their December issues. It is about 45 pages in length, and updated each year with additions, deletions, name changes, capacity changes and other refinements.

This article contains a list of 697 oil refineries as of January 2020.

World's largest refineries

Africa

Algeria
 Skikda Refinery (Sonatrach),  350,000 bbl/day (16,50 million tonne/year)
 Skikda condensate Refinery (Sonatrach),  100,000 bbl/day (5,00 million tonne/year)
 Adrar Refinery (CNPC, Sonatrach), 12,500 bbl/day (0.600 million tonne/year)
 Algiers Refinery (Sonatrach), 3.645 million tonne/year
 Arzew Refinery (Sonatrach),  3.750 million tonne/year
 Hassi Messaoud Refinery (Sonatrach), 5.00 million tonne/year (in construction commissioning in 2024)

Angola
 Cabinda Refinery (Chevron Corporation), 
 Luanda Refinery (Sonangol),

Cameroon
 Limbé Refinery (Sonara),

Chad
  Djarmaya Refinery (Societe d'Etude et d'Exploitation de la Raffinerie (SEERAT)),

Congo
 Pointe Noire Refinery (CORAF),

Congo, Democratic Republic
 Muanda Refinery (SOCIR),  (not in working order since 2000)

Egypt
 Alexandria Ameriya Refinery (EGPC), 
 Alexandria El Mex Refinery (EGPC), 
 Alexandria MIDOR Refinery (EGPC), 
 Asyut Refinery (EGPC), 
 Cairo Mostorod Refinery (EGPC), 
 El Nasr Refinery (EGPC), 
 El Suez Refinery (EGPC), 
 Tanta Refinery (EGPC), 
 Wadi Feran Refinery (EGPC), 
 BASHANDYOIL fossil crude oil refinery, 300,000 barrels per day, at El Sokna, Suez (under construction)
 Egyptian Refining Co.ERC 
Mostorod,Egypt (80,000bbl/d)

Eritrea
 Assab Refinery (Assab Refinery),

Gabon
 Port Gentil Refinery (Sogara),

Ghana
 Tema Oil Refinery (TOR)

Ivory Coast
 Abidjan Refinery (SIR), 
 Abidjan Bitumen Refinery (SMBCI),

Kenya
 Mombasa Refinery (KPRL), Nelson Complexity Index 2.64
 Lamu Refinery Lamu Port and Lamu-Southern Sudan-Ethiopia Transport Corridor  (planned; finance and contractors are still not finalised)

Libya
 Zawiya Refinery (National Oil Corporation), 
 Ra's Lanuf Refinery (National Oil Corporation), 
 El-Brega Refinery (National Oil Corporation), 
 Sarir Refinery (Arabian Gulf Oil Company), 
 Tobruk Refinery (Arabian Gulf Oil Company),

Madagascar
 Tomasina Refinery (Galana),  destroyed in Cyclone Geralda 1994

Mauritania

 Nouadhibou Refinery (SOMIR),

Morocco
 Mohammedia Refinery (SAMIR),  - closed
 Sidi Kacem (SAMIR),  - closed

Niger
 Zinder Refinery (Société de Raffinage de Zinder),

Nigeria
 Kaduna Refinery (NNPC), 
 Port Harcourt Refinery (NNPC), 
 Warri Refinery (NNPC), 
 Waltersmith Refinery (Waltersmith Refining and Petrochemical Company), 
 Dangote Refinery (Dangote Group),  - (Under construction; estimated completion is Q4-2022)
 Azikel Refinery (Azikel Petroleum),  - (Under Construction; estimated completion is summer 2023)
 Ogbele Refinery (Niger Delta Petroleum Resources),

South Africa
 Cape Town Refinery (Chevref) (Chevron South Africa), 
 Engen Refinery (Enref) (Petronas), 
 Sapref Refinery (a joint venture of Royal Dutch Shell and BP) (Sapref),  Nelson Complexity Index 8.44
 Sasol Refinery (Secunda CTL) (Sasol),  (crude equivalent)
 Natref Refinery (a joint venture between Sasol and Total South Africa), 
 Mossel Bay GTL Refinery (PetroSA),

Sudan
 El-Obeid Refinery (El Obeid Refinery Co), 
 Khartoum Refinery (Sudan Khartoum Refinery Company), 
 Port Sudan Refinery (Port Sudan Petroleum Refinery Limited),  (decommissioned)

Tanzania
 Dar es Salaam Refinery (TIPER),

Tunisia
 Bizerte Refinery (STIR),

Uganda
 Uganda Oil Refinery  (planned; finance and contractors are still not finalised)

Zambia
 Indeni Petroleum Refinery,

Asia

Afghanistan
 Ghazanfar Oil Refinery, (Ghazanfar Group) Hairatan, Balkh 11,874 barrels per day
 Kam Oil Refinery, (Kam Group) Hairatan, Balkh 11,874 barrels per day

Bahrain
 Bahrain Petroleum Company (Bapco), 267,000 barrels per day

Bangladesh
 Eastern Refinery (BPC), 
 Petromax Refinery, 
 Super Petrochemical (Pvt.) Ltd., 
 Bashundhara Oil and Gas Company Ltd.,

China

 Fushun Petrochemical Refinery, Fushun Petrochemical Company (CNPC), 
 Sinopec Anqing Company Refinery, 110,000 bbl/day
 Sinopec Beijing Yanshan Company Refinery,  165,000 bbl/day
 China National Petroleum Corporation (PetroChina)  Lanzhou Refiner,  112,000 bbl/day
 Sinopec CPCC Guangzhou Branch Refinery, 150,000 bbl/day
 Sinopec Maoming Company Refinery, 265,000 bbl/day
 Sinopec Beihai Company Refinery, 12,000 bbl/day
 Sinopec Cangzhou Company Refinery, 70,000 bbl/day
 China National Petroleum Corporation (PetroChina)  Daqing Petrochemical Refinery, 122,000 bbl/day
 Sinopec Luoyang Company, 100,000 bbl/day
 Sinopec Jingmen Company, 100,000 bbl/day
 Sinopec Wuhan Company Refinery, 80,000 bbl/day
 Sinopec CPCC Changling Company Refinery, 100,000 bbl/day
 Sinopec Jinling Company Refinery, 265,000 bbl/day
 Sinopec Jiujiang Company Refinery, 98,000 bbl/day
 China National Petroleum Corporation (PetroChina) Jilin Chemical Refinery, 115,000 bbbl/day
 China National Petroleum Corporation (PetroChina) Dalian Petrochemical Refinery, 144,000 bbl/day
 China National Petroleum Corporation (PetroChina) Fushun Petrochemical Refinery, 186,000 bbl/day
 China National Petroleum Corporation (PetroChina) Jinxi Refinery, 112,000 bbl/day
 China National Petroleum Corporation (PetroChina) Jinzhou Petrochemical Refinery, 112,000 bbl/day
 WEPEC Dalain Refinery, 200,000 bbl/day
 Sinopec Jinan Company, 21,000 bbl/day
 Sinopec Qilu Company Refinery, 195,000 bbl/day
 Sinopec Shanghai Gaoqiao Oil Refinery, 220,000 bbl/day
 Sinopec Tianjin Company Refinery, 100,000 bbl/day
 China National Petroleum Corporation (PetroChina)  Dushanzi Refinery, 120,000 bbl/day
 China National Petroleum Corporation (PetroChina)  Ürümqi Petrochemical, 101,000 bbl/day
 Sinopec Zhenhai Refinery, 345,000 bbl/day

India

Bongaigaon Refinery (IOCL), Bongaigaon, 2.35 million tonnes per year
Digboi Refinery (IOCL), Upper Assam, India's Oldest Refinery,  0.62 million tonnes per year
Guwahati Refinery (IOCL), Noonmati, Guwahati,  1.0 million tonnes per year
Numaligarh Refinery (NRL), Golaghat District, 3.0 million tonnes per year
Barauni Refinery (IOCL), near Patna, 6.0 million tonnes per year Nelson Complexity Index 7.8 
Nayara Refinery (Rosneft),  Nelson Complexity Index 12.8
Gujarat Refinery (IOCL), Vadodara, Nelson Complexity Index 10.0  
Jamnagar Refinery (Reliance Industries), world's largest petroleum refinery,   Nelson Complexity Index 21.1
Panipat Refinery (IOCL), 15 million tonnes per year. Nelson Complexity Index 10.5 
Mangalore Refinery (MRPL),  Nelson Complexity Index 10.6 
Bina Refinery (BORL), 
Guru Gobind Singh Refinery (HMEL), Bathinda, with capacity of 11.2 million tonnes per year or 230,000 barrels per day. Nelson Complexity Index 12.6 
Haldia Refinery (IOCL), Nelson Complexity Index 10.4 
Paradip Refinery (IOCL),  Nelson Complexity Index 12.2
Mathura Refinery (IOCL), 
Mumbai Refinery (HPCL), 
Mumbai Refinery Mahaul (BPCL), 
Visakhapatnam Refinery (HPCL), 
Tatipaka Refinery (ONGC), 
Kochi Refinery (BPCL),  Nelson Complexity Index 10.8 
Manali Refinery (CPCL), Chennai, 
Cuddalore Refinery (NOCL), 
Nagapattnam Refinery (CPCL),

Indonesia
 Plaju Refinery (Pertamina), 
 Balongan Refinery (Pertamina), 
 Dumai Refinery (Pertamina), 
 Sei Pakning Refinery (Pertamina), 
 Cilacap Refinery (Pertamina), 
 Tuban Refinery (Pertamina), 
 Balikpapan Refinery (Pertamina), 
 Cepu Refinery (Pusdiklat Migas Cepu), 
 Kasim Refinery (Pertamina),

Iran
 Abadan Refinery (NIODC), 
 Arvand oil refinery (NIODC), 
 Arak Refinery (NIODC), 
 Tehran Refinery (NIODC), 
 Isfahan Refinery (NIODC), 
 Tabriz Refinery (NIODC), 
 Shiraz Refinery (NIODC), 
 Lavan Refinery (NIODC), 
 Persian Gulf Star Oil Refinery (NIODC), 
 Kermanshah Refinery (NIODC), 
 Bandar Abbas Refinery (NIODC), 
 Pars Refinery (NIODC),  (under construction)
 Anahita Refinery (NIODC),  (under construction)
 Bahman Geno Refinery (NIODC),  (under construction)

Iraq
 Basrah Refinery (Iraq National Oil Company), 
 Daurah Refinery (Iraq National Oil Company), 
 Kirkuk Refinery (Iraq National Oil Company), 
 Baiji Salahedden Refinery (Iraq National Oil Company), 
 Baiji North Refinery (Iraq National Oil Company), 
 Khanaqin/Alwand Refinery (Iraq National Oil Company), 
 Samawah Refinery (Iraq National Oil Company), 
 Haditha Refinery (Iraq National Oil Company), 
 Muftiah Refinery (Iraq National Oil Company), 
 Majd Al Iraq (Iraq National Oil Company), 
 Gaiyarah Refinery (Iraq National Oil Company), 
 Erbil Refinery (KAR Group) Kurdistan, 
 Mirsan Refinery (MIRC Group), Kurdistan

Israel
 Ashdod Oil Refineries (Paz Oil Company), 
 Haifa Refinery (BAZAN Group),

Japan
 (Chiba Refinery) (Cosmo Oil Company), 
 Yokkaichi Refinery (Cosmo Oil Company), 
 Sakai Refinery (Cosmo Oil) (Cosmo Oil Company),  
 Sakaide Refinery (Cosmo Oil Company),  
 Muroran Refinery (JXTG Nippon Oil & Energy), 
 Sendai Refinery (JXTG Nippon Oil & Energy),  
 Negishi Yokohama Refinery (JXTG Nippon Oil & Energy),  
 Osaka Refinery (JXTG Nippon Oil & Energy),   Closed 2020 converted to an asphalt-fired power plant.
 Mizushima Refinery (JXTG Nippon Oil & Energy),  
 Marifu Refinery (JXTG Nippon Oil & Energy), 
 Toyama Refinery (Nihonkai Oil JXTG Nippon Oil & Energy), 
 Kubiki Refinery (Teikoku Oil), 
 Chiba Refinery (Kyokuto) (Kyokuto Petroleum/ExxonMobil), 
 Kawasaki Refinery (JXTG Nippon Oil & Energy/ExxonMobil), 
 Wakayama Refinery (JXTG Nippon Oil & Energy/ExxonMobil), 
 Sakai Refinery (JXTG Nippon Oil & Energy) (JXTG Nippon Oil & Energy/ExxonMobil), 
 Nishihara Refinery (Nansei sekiyu/Petrobras), 
 Keihin Refinery (Toa Oil/Royal Dutch Shell), 
 Showa Yokkaichi Refinery (Showa Yokkaichi/Royal Dutch Shell), 
 Yamaguchi Refinery (Seibu Oil/Royal Dutch Shell), 
 Sodegaura Refinery (Fuji Oil Company), 
 Kashima Refinery (Kashima Oil Company/Japan Energy), 
 Mizushima Refinery (Japan Energy) (Japan Energy), 
 Shikoku Refinery (Taiyo Oil), Taiyo Oil 
 Ohita Refinery (Kyusyu Oil), Kyusyu Oil 
 Hokkaido Refinery (Idemitsu Kosan), 
 Chiba Refinery (Idemitsu) (Idemitsu Kosan), 
 Aichi Refinery (Idemitsu Kosan), 
 Tokuyama Refinery (Idemitsu Kosan),

Jordan
 Jordan Refinery, Zarqa, Az Zarqa (Jordan Petroleum Refinery Company),

Kazakhstan
 Atyrau Refinery (KazMunayGas), 
 Pavlodar Refinery (KazMunayGas), 
 Shymkent Refinery (PetroKazakhstan),

Kuwait
 Mina Al-Ahmadi Refinery (Kuwait National Petroleum Company), 
 Shuaiba Refinery (Kuwait National Petroleum Company),  - shut down in April 2017
 Mina Abdullah Refinery (Kuwait National Petroleum Company), 
 Al Zour Refinery, Kuwait National Petroleum Company (KNPC), 6,15,000bbl/d)Malaysia
 Pengerang Refining Company Sdn Bhd (PRefChem Refining) (Petronas and Saudi Aramco Joint Venture), Pengerang, 
 Malaysian Refining Company Sdn Bhd (MRCSB) (Petronas), Melaka, 
 PSR-1, Melaka I Refinery (formerly known as Petronas Penapisan (Melaka) Sdn Bhd) (Petronas), 
 PSR-2, Melaka II Refinery (formerly operated by Petronas and Phillips 66 Joint Venture) (Petronas), 
 Petronas Penapisan (Terengganu) Sdn Bhd (PP(T)SB) (Petronas), Kerteh, 
 Hengyuan Refining Company Berhad (formerly known as Shell Refining Company (Federation of Malaya) Berhad) (HRC), Port Dickson, 
 Port Dickson Refinery (Petron), Port Dickson, 
 Kemaman Bitumen Refinery (TIPCO), Kemaman, 

Myanmar
 Thanlyin Refinery (Myanma Petrochemical Enterprise ), 

Oman
 Mina Al Fahal, Oman Refinery Company (ORPIC),  
 Sohar Refinery Company (SRC) (ORPIC), 
 OQ8 ((Duqmrefinery),  CLOSE TO START UPPakistan
 Pak-Arab Refinery Ltd. Multan (PARCO), Multan, Punjab 
 National Refinery (NRL), Korangi, Karachi, Sindh 
 Attock Refinery Ltd. (ARL), Rawalpindi, Punjab 
 Byco Petroleum (Byco), Hub, Baluchistan 
 Pakistan Refinery (PRL), Korangi Creek, Karachi, Sindh 
 Enar Petroleum Refinery Training Facility (Enar), Gadap, Karachi, Sindh 
 PARCO Coastal Refinery (PARCO) Khalifa Point, Lasbela, Balochistan  (under construction)Gwadar Refinery (ARAMCO) Gwadar District, Balochistan   (cancelled, plans to relocate) Indus Oil Refinery, (Indus) Karachi, Sindh  (under construction, stalled) Grace Refinery Limited (GRL) Kot Addu, Muzaffargarh, Punjab (120,000 bbl/d) (under construction) Al Motahedon Petroleum Refineries Kohat, KP (50,000 bbl/d) (under construction)Khyber Refinery (Pvt) Ltd, Kushalgarh, Kohat, KP 20,000 bbl/d (under construction)Philippines
 Bataan Refinery (Philippine National Oil Company), Limay, Bataan 
 Tabangao Refinery (Royal Dutch Shell), Tabangao, Batangas  - ceased refinery operations 2021 and converted into an import terminal.
 Batangas Refinery (Caltex (Chevron)), Batangas City, Batangas  - ceased operation in 2003 to give way to a P750-million finished product import terminal

Qatar
 Um Said Refinery (QP Refinery 100%), 
 Laffan Refinery 1 (QatarEnergy 51%, ExxonMobil 10%, Total 10%, Idemitsu 10%, Cosmo Oil Company 10%, Mitsui 4.5%, Marubeni 4.5%), 
 Laffan Refinery 2 (QatarEnergy 84%, Total 10%, Cosmo 2%, Idemitsu 2%, Mitsui 1% and Marubeni 1%), 146,000 bbl/d

Russia
 Achinsk Refinery (Rosneft), 

 Angarsk Petrochemical Refinery (Rosneft), 

 Khabarovsk Refinery (АО "ННК-Хабаровский НПЗ"::Главная), 
 Komsomolsk Refinery (Rosneft), 
 Nizhnevartovsk Refinery (Rosneft), 
 Novoshakhtinsk Oil Refinery,  
 Omsk Refinery (Gazprom Neft), 
 Tobolsk Petrochemical Refinery (Sibur), 
 Yaya Refinery (NefteKhimService), 

Saudi Arabia
 Riyadh Refinery (Saudi Aramco), 
 Rabigh Refinery (Saudi Aramco/Sumitomo), 
 Jeddah Refinery (Saudi Aramco),  - CLOSED
 Ras Tanura Refinery (Saudi Aramco), 
 Yanbu' Refinery (Saudi Aramco), 
 Yanbu' Refinery (SAMREF) (Saudi Aramco/ExxonMobil), 
 Jubail Refinery (SATORP) (Saudi Aramco/Total), 
 YASREF Refinery (Yanbu, KSA) (Saudi Aramco/Sinopec), 
 Jazan Refinery (Saudi Aramco, scheduled to begin commissioning/start up 2022 at the earliest), 
 Jubail Refinery (SASREF) (Saudi Aramco), 

Singapore
 ExxonMobil Jurong Island Refinery (ExxonMobil), 
 SRC Jurong Island Refinery (Singapore Petroleum Company), 
 Shell Pulau Bukom Refinery (Royal Dutch Shell), 

Sri Lanka
 Sapugaskanda Refinery (Ceylon Petroleum Co.), 

South Korea
 SK Energy Co., Ltd. Ulsan Refinery (SK Energy), 
 S-Oil Onsan Refinery (S-Oil), 
 GS-Caltex Yeosu Refinery (GS Caltex), 
 SK Incheon Petrochem (SK Innovation/SK Incheon Petrochem), 
 Hyundai Oilbank Daesan Refinery (Hyundai Oilbank), 

Syria
 Homs Refinery
 Banias Refinery

Taiwan
 Dalin Refinery (CPC), 
 Kaohsiung Refinery (CPC),  Ceased operations end 2015.
 Mailiao Refinery (Formosa Plastics Corp), 
 Taoyuan Refinery (CPC), 

Thailand
 Thai Oil Refinery (Thai Oil Company of PTT Public Company Limited), 
 IRPC Refinery (IRPC PLC of PTT), 
 PTT Global Chemical Refinery (PTT Global Chemical PLC of PTT), 
 SPRC Refinery (Star Petroleum Refining Company of PTT), 
 Bangchak Refinery (Bangchak Petroleum), 
 Sriracha Refinery (ExxonMobil), 
 Rayong Purifier Refinery (Rayong Purifier Company), 

Turkey
 STAR Refinery (Socar),  (operating since end 2018) Kirikkale Refinery (Tüpraş), 
 Izmit Refinery (Tüpraş), 
 Aliaga Refinery (Tüpraş), 
 Batman Refinery (Tüpraş) 
 Doğu Akdeniz Petrol Refinery (Çalık Holding) (under construction)''
 ATAŞ (Refinery) (BP-Royal Dutch Shell-Turcas) (closed)

Turkmenistan
 Seidi, 
 Turkmenbashi,

United Arab Emirates
 Abu Dhabi Refinery (Abu Dhabi Oil Refining Company), 
 Fujairah VTTI Refinery (VITOL Group), 
 Fujairah ECOMAR Refinery, 
 Uniper - Fujairah (heavy crude oil flashers), 70,000 BPD
 Ruwais Refinery (Abu Dhabi Oil Refining Company),  - 2 refineries
 Jebel Ali Refinery ([ENOC]), 
 Al Nakheel Oil Refinery ([ANOR]) (closed)

Vietnam
 Dung Quat Refinery (Petrovietnam), 
 Nghi Sơn Refinery (Nghi Son Refinery and Petrochemical LLC),

Yemen
 Aden Refinery (Aden Refinery Company), 
 Marib Refinery (Hunt Oil Company),

Europe

Albania
 Ballsh Refinery (ARMO Oil Refiner), 
 Fier Refinery (ARMO Oil Refiner), 
  Bitex Refinery, Elbasan, Albania,

Austria
 Schwechat Refinery (OMV),

Azerbaijan
 Heydar Aliyev Baku Oil Refinery (SOCAR), 
 Azerneftyag Refinery (SOCAR), 2.3 million tonnes/year of crude oil, according to SOCAR's latest annual report (2013)

Bosnia and Herzegovina
 Bosanski Brod Refinery Nestro, a subsidiary of JSC Zarubezhneft (Russia), 1.5 million tons/annum & 30,000 bbl/day

Belarus
 Mozyr Refinery (Slavneft) 
 Novopolotsk Refinery (Naftan)

Belgium
 Total Antwerp Refinery (Total), 
 ExxonMobil Antwerp Refinery (ExxonMobil), 
 Antwerp N.V. Refinery (Vitol),    Closed 2021 converted to  distribution terminal.
 Independent Belgian Refinery, Antwerp (Gunvor),   - Closed in 2020 converted to  distribution terminal.

Bulgaria
 LUKOIL Neftochim Burgas (LUKOIL), 
 Dididom oil refinery (DIDIDOM), 60,000 bbl/d (9,500 m3/d)

Croatia
 Rijeka Refinery (INA), 
 Sisak Refinery (INA),

Czech Republic
 Litvinov Refinery (Orlen Unipetrol), 
 Kralupy Refinery (Orlen Unipetrol), 
 Pardubice Refinery (PARAMO, owned by Orlen Unipetrol),  - closed in 2009, converted to distribution terminal

Denmark
 Kalundborg Refinery (Klesch), 
 Fredericia Refinery (Royal Dutch Shell),

Finland
 Porvoo Refinery (Neste), 
 Naantali Refinery (Neste Oil Oyj),  Closed 2021 Converted to distribution terminal.

France
 Normandy Refinery (Total), 
 Port Jérôme-Gravenchon Refinery (ExxonMobil), 
 Donges Refinery (Total), 
 Lavera Oil Refinery (PetroIneos),  210,000 bbl/d (33,300m3/d)
 La Mede refinery (Total),  - converted to biorefinery, and reopened 2019
 Fos-sur-Mer Refinery (ExxonMobil), 
Feyzin Refinery (Total), 
 Grandpuits Refinery (Total),  Crude prossesing stopped in 2021 being converted in biorefinery and plastic recycling complex
 Fort de France Refinery (Total),

Closed
 Flandres Refinery (Total),  - closed
 Berre L'Etang Refinery (LyondellBasell),  - mothballed in 2011
 Petit Couronne Refinery (Petroplus),  - closed
 Reichstett Refinery (Petroplus),  - closed

Germany
 Wilhelmshaven Refinery (Hestya), 
 MiRO Karlsruhe Refinery (MiRO(Shell/ExxonMobil/Rosneft/Phillips 66))  Nelson Complexity Index 9.33
 Ruhr Öl Refinery (BP),  Nelson Complexity Index 8.44
 Ingolstadt Refinery (Bayernoil(VARO/Eni/Rosneft/BP)),  Nelson Complexity Index 7.20
 TOTAL Refinery Mitteldeutschland (Total) , at the Leuna works site in Saxony-Anhalt.
 Schwedt Refinery (PCK Raffinerie GmbH(Shell/Rosneft/Eni),  Nelson Complexity Index 10.43
 Rheinland Werk Godorf Cologne Refinery (Royal Dutch Shell), 
 Rheinland Werk Wesseling Cologne Refinery (Royal Dutch Shell), 
 Ingolstadt Refinery (Gunvor), 
 Hamburg (Holburn) Refinery (Tamoil) 
 Raffinerie Heide (Klesch)  Nelson Complexity Index 9.9
 Emsland Lingen Refinery (BP)  Nelson Complexity Index 10.77
 Burghausen Refinery (OMV) 
 Elbe Mineralölwerke Hamburg-Harburg Refinery (Royal Dutch Shell; an agreement to sell to Nynas was announced on 12 December 2011)

Greece
 Corinth Refinery (Motor Oil Hellas), Corinth, Peloponnese 
 Aspropyrgos Refinery (Hellenic Petroleum), Aspropyrgos, West Attica 
 Elefsina Refinery (Hellenic Petroleum), Elefsina, West Attica  
 Thessaloniki Refinery (Hellenic Petroleum), Thessaloniki, Central Macedonia

Hungary
 Szazhalombatta Refinery (MOL), Szazhalombatta, Pest

Ireland
 Whitegate refinery (Irving Oil),

Italy
 Sarlux Sarroch Refinery (Saras S.p.A.) 
 Lukoil Impianti Sud Refinery (ISAB ERG), 
 Milazzo RAM Refinery (Eni, Kuwait Petroleum Italia SPA) 
 Sarpom Trecate, Novara Refinery (ExxonMobil 74.1%/ERG 25.9%), 
 Sonatrach Augusta Refinery (formerly Esso Italiana, affiliate of ExxonMobil), 
 Lukoil Impianti Nord Refinery (ISAB ERG), 
 Sannazzaro de' Burgondi Refinery (Eni) 
 Falconara Marittima Ancona Refinery (API), 
 Taranto Refinery (Eni) 
 Iplom Busalla Refinery (IPLOM), 1.890.000 ton/annum capacity

Closed
 Livorno Refinery (Eni)  Crude prossessing being stopped 2022
 Porto Marghera Venice Refinery (Eni)  - closed, converted into biorefinery, restarted production June 2014 (capacity less than 6,000 barrels/day)
 Cremona Refiney (Tamoil)  - closed March 2011
 Mantova Refinery (IES Italiana),  - closed January 2013
 Gela Refinery (Eni)  - closed, being converted into biorefinery
 Rome Refinery (Total 77.5%/ERG 22.5%),  - closed June 2012

Lithuania
 Mažeikių Refinery (Mazeikiu Nafta - PKN Orlen),

Netherlands
 Shell Pernis Refinery (Royal Dutch Shell), 
 BP Rotterdam Refinery (BP),  Nelson Complexity Index 5.29
 Botlek (ExxonMobil) Rotterdam, 
 Zeeland Refinery (Total/Lukoil) 
 Gunvor Refinery Europoort (Gunvor),   Crude processing stopped 2020. 
 VPR Refinery (Vitol)

North Macedonia
 OKTA Skopje Refinery (Hellenic Petroleum),

Norway
 Slagen Refinery (ExxonMobil),  Closed 2021.Converted to import terminal.
 Mongstad Refinery (Equinor),

Poland
 Plock Refinery (PKN Orlen), 
 Gdansk Refinery (Grupa LOTOS),  (processing capacity after second distillation startup in 1Q2010).
 Czechowice Refinery (Grupa LOTOS), crude oil processing terminated 1Q2006
 Trzebinia Refinery (PKN Orlen), 
 Jaslo Oil Refinery (Grupa LOTOS), crude oil processing terminated 4Q2008
 Jedlicze Refinery (PKN Orlen), 
 Glimar Refinery (Hudson Oil),  - all operations (including crude oil processing) terminated 2005, acquired 2011

Portugal
 Sines Refinery (Galp Energia), 
 Porto Refinery (Galp Energia), Closed in April 2021.

Romania
 Petromidia Constanţa Refinery (Rompetrol), 
 Petrobrazi Refinery Ploiești (Petrom/OMV), 
 Petrotel Lukoil Refinery Ploiești (LUKOIL), 
 Vega Ploiești Refinery (Rompetrol), 
 Petrolsub Suplacu de Barcău Refinery (Petrom/OMV),

closed
 RAFO Oneşti (Calder A),  - closed
 Steaua Romană Câmpina Refinery (Omnimpex Chemicals),  - Closed
 Arpechim Refinery Pitești (Petrom/OMV),  - Closed
 Astra Refinery (Interagro),  '- closed

Russia

 JSC Antipinsky Refinery (JSC Antipinsky Refinery), 
 Kirishi Refinery (Surgutneftegas), 
 Krasnodar Refinery (Russneft), 
 Kuibyshev Refinery (Rosneft), 
 Moscow Refinery (Gazprom Neft), 
 Nizhnekamsk Refinery (TANEKO), 
 Nizhnekamsk Refinery (TAIF), 
 NORSI-oil (LUKOIL, Kstovo), 
 Novokuibyshevsk Refinery (Rosneft), 
 Novoshakhtinsk Refinery (Новошахтинский завод нефтепродуктов), 
 Orsk Refinery (SAFMAR), 
 Perm Refinery (LUKOIL), 
 Ryazan Refinery (Rosneft), 
 Salavatnefteorgsintez Refinery (Gazprom), 
 Saratov Refinery (Rosneft), 
 Syzran Refinery (Rosneft), 
 Tuapse Refinery (Rosneft), 
 Ukhta Refinery (LUKOIL), 
 Ufa Refinery (Bashneft), 
 Novo-Ufa Refinery (Bashneft), 
 Ufaneftekhim Refinery (Bashneft), 
 Volgograd Refinery (LUKOIL), 
 Yaroslavl Refinery (Slavneft),

Serbia
 Pančevo Refinery (Naftna Industrija Srbije),
 Novi Sad Refinery (Naftna Industrija Srbije),
 Hemco Refinery Hemco Lubricants

Slovakia
 Slovnaft Bratislava Refinery (MOL), 
 Petrochema Dubová Refinery (Russian investors), Petrochema

Spain
 Bilbao Refinery (Petronor), 
 Puertollano Refinery (Repsol), 
 Tarragona Refinery (Repsol), 
 Tarragona Asphalt Refinery (ASESA), 
 A Coruña Refinery (Repsol), 
 Cartagena Refinery (Repsol), 
 Tenerife Refinery (CEPSA),  - To be closed in 2030
 Palos de la Frontera Refinery (CEPSA), 
 Gibraltar-San Roque Refinery (CEPSA), 
 Castellon Refinery (BP),  Nelson Complexity Index 10.58

Sweden
 Lysekil Refinery (220,000 bpd refining capacity) (Preem)
 Gothenburg Refinery (132,000 bpd refining capacity) (Preem)
 Nynäshamn Refinery (90,000 bpd refining capacity) (Nynas)
 Gothenburg Refinery (78,000 bpd refining capacity) (st1)

Switzerland
 Cressier Refinery (VaroEnergy), 
 Collombey-Muraz Refinery (Tamoil),  - closed end of March 2015

Ukraine
 Halychyna Refinery (Pryvat), 
 Kherson Refinery (Alliance), 
 Kremenchuk Refinery (Ukrtatnafta), 
 LINOS Refinery (TNK-BP), 
 Lviv Oil Research & Refinery
 Naftokhimik Prykarpattya (Pryvat), 
 Odesa Refinery (LUKOIL),

United Kingdom
England
 Coryton Refinery (Petroplus),  - shut down; converted to terminal in 2012
 Fawley Refinery (ExxonMobil), 
 Humber Refinery (Phillips 66),  Nelson Complexity Index 11.6
Kent Refinery (BP), 4,000,000 tonnes/year - closed 1982 
 Lindsey Oil Refinery (Prax), 
 Teesside Refinery (Petroplus),  - closed 2009
Shell Haven Refinery (Royal Dutch Shell), 6,000 tonnes/d - closed 1999
 Stanlow Refinery (Essar Oil), 

Scotland
 Grangemouth Refinery (Petroineos, a joint venture of Ineos and PetroChina), 

Wales
 Milford Haven Refinery (Murco), - closed in November 2014
 Pembroke Refinery (Valero), Nelson Complexity Index 11.6

North & Central America

Aruba
 Aruba Refinery (Valero)  - closed in 2012; to be converted to terminal

Canada

General information
As of 2018, Canadian refineries process  of crude oil, and produce  of petroleum products.

Alberta
 Strathcona Refinery, Sherwood Park, Strathcona County (Imperial Oil), 
 Scotford Refinery, Strathcona County (Shell Oil Company), 
 Edmonton Refinery, Strathcona County (Suncor Energy), 
 Sturgeon Refinery, Redwater, Sturgeon County (North West Redwater Partnership), 
 Husky Lloydminster Refinery, Lloydminster, Vermilion River, (Husky Energy),

British Columbia
 Burnaby Refinery, Burnaby (Parkland Fuel), 
 Prince George Refinery, Prince George (Tidewater),

New Brunswick
 Irving Oil Refinery, Saint John (Irving Oil),

Newfoundland and Labrador
 North Atlantic Refinery, Come by Chance (North Atlantic Refining),

Ontario
 Nanticoke Refinery, Nanticoke (Imperial Oil), 
 Sarnia Refinery, Sarnia (Imperial Oil), 
 Shell Corunna Refinery, Corunna (Shell Canada), 
 Clarkson Refinery 2, Mississauga, Ontario (HollyFrontier), 
 Sarnia Refinery, Sarnia (Suncor Energy),

Quebec
 Montreal Refinery, Montreal (Suncor Energy), 
 Jean-Gaulin Refinery, Lévis, (Valero),

Saskatchewan
 CCRL Refinery Complex, Regina, (FCL)), 
 Moose Jaw Refinery, Moose Jaw (Gibson Energy),

Cuba
 Nico López Refinery (Cupet) Havana, Cuba
 Hermanos Díaz Refinery (Cupet) Santiago, Cuba 
 Cienfuegos Refinery (Cupet) Cienfuegos, Cuba

Curaçao
 Isla Refinery (RdK)

Costa Rica
 Puerto Limón Refinery (Recope) (start-up 1967), not operational since 2011

Dominican Republic
 Haina Refinery (REFIDOMSA)  (start-up 1973)

El Salvador
 Refinería Petrolera de Acajutla S.A. de C.V. (Puma Energy)  (start-up 1962) closed in October 2012 to become a  terminal.

Guatemala
 Puerto Barrios Refinery (Texaco-out of use) 
 La Libertad Refinery (Perenco)

Honduras
 Puerto Cortés Refinery (REFTEXA) (Texaco)  - closed

Jamaica
 Kingston Refinery (PetroJam & PDVSA)

Martinique
 Fort de France (SARA)

Mexico
 Tula Refinery (Pemex) Tula, Hidalgo 
 Minatitlan Refinery (Pemex) Minatitlan, Veracruz 
 Cadereyta Refinery (Pemex) Cadereyta Jiménez, Nuevo León 
 Salamanca Refinery (Pemex) Salamanca, Guanajuato  
 Francisco I. Madero Refinery (Pemex) Ciudad Madero, Tamaulipas 
 Salina Cruz Refinery (Pemex) Salina Cruz, Oaxaca 
 Dos Bocas or Olmeca Refinery (Pemex) Paraiso, Tabasco Under Construction, Set to open on July 1, 2022.  The refinery will have a capacity of 340,000 barrels of oil.

Nicaragua
 Managua Refinery (MANREF)-Managua (Puma Energy)  (Formerly ESSO/ExxonMobil) (start-up 1962)

Trinidad and Tobago
 Pointe-à-Pierre Refinery (Petrotrin) (Previously Texaco)  Closed November 2018

United States
, there were 125 operating oil refineries in the United States per the U.S. Energy Information Administration (EIA).

Alabama
 Atmore Refinery (Goodway Refining LLC), Atmore, 
 Saraland Refinery (Vertex Energy), Saraland, 
 Tuscaloosa Refinery (Hunt Refining Company), Tuscaloosa,  or 36,000 barrels/ calendar day per EIA

Alaska
 Kenai Refinery (Marathon Petroleum Company), Kenai, 
 North Pole Refinery (Petro Star by Arctic Slope Regional Corporation), North Pole, 
 North Pole Refinery (Flint Hills Resources LP by Koch Industries), North Pole,  (shut down in 2014)
 Prudhoe Bay Refinery (BP Exploration Alaska Inc by BP), Prudhoe Bay, 
 Prudhoe Bay Refinery (ConocoPhillips), Prudhoe Bay, 
 Valdez Refinery (Petro Star by Arctic Slope Regional Corporation), Valdez,

Arkansas
 El Dorado Refinery (Delek), El Dorado, 
 Smackover Refinery (Cross Oil Refining & Marketing Inc by Martin Midstream Partners LP), Smackover,

California
 Bakersfield Refinery (Kern Oil & Refining Co.), Bakersfield, 
 Bakersfield Refinery (San Joaquin Refining Co.), Bakersfield, 
 Benicia Refinery (Valero), Benicia, Nelson Complexity Index 16.1
 El Segundo Refinery (Chevron), El Segundo, 
 Los Angeles Refinery (Marathon), Carson and Wilmington,  (the formerly separate Carson and Wilmington refineries began reporting as one entity in 2019) Nelson Complexity Index 12.07
 Los Angeles Refinery (Phillips 66), Wilmington and Carson, Nelson Complexity Index 14.3
 Martinez Refinery (PBF Energy), Martinez, Nelson Complexity Index 16.1
 Paramount Refinery (World Energy), Paramount, idle as of 12 March 2021
 Richmond Refinery (Chevron), Richmond, 
 San Francisco Refinery (Phillips 66), Rodeo and Arroyo Grande, Nelson Complexity Index 13.3 (the 200-mile-apart but connected Rodeo and Santa Maria/Arroyo Grande refineries began reporting as one entity in 2017)  Intended to be closed and Converted to renewable fuels plant by 2024 
 Santa Maria Refinery (Greka Energy), Santa Maria, 
 South Gate Refinery (World Oil Corp., formerly Lunday-Thagard Co.), South Gate, 
 Torrance Refinery (PBF Energy), Torrance, Nelson Complexity Index 13.8 (was 14.9)
 Wilmington Asphalt Refinery (Valero), Wilmington, 
 Wilmington Refinery (Valero), Wilmington, Nelson Complexity Index 15.9

Colorado
 Commerce City Refinery (Suncor Energy), Commerce City,

Delaware
 Delaware City Refinery (Delaware City Refining Co LLC by PBF Energy), Delaware City,  Nelson Complexity Index 11.3

Georgia
 Savannah Refinery (Nustar Asphalt Refining LLC by NuStar Energy), Savannah, (Asphalt Refinery)

Hawaii
 Kapolei Refinery (Par Hawaii Refining, LLC a subsidiary of Par Pacific Holdings), Ewa Beach (Kapolei), . Chevron sold their Hawaii Refinery to newly formed Island Energy Services LLC in 2016, and IES sold the refining assets to Par Hawaii Refining, LLC in 2018 but retained Terminal and pipeline assets.

Illinois
 Lemont Refinery (Citgo), Lemont, 
 Joliet Refinery (ExxonMobil), Joliet, 
 Robinson Refinery (Marathon Petroleum Company), Robinson, 
 Wood River Refinery (WRB Refining LP by Phillips 66/Cenovus, Roxana,  Nelson Complexity Index 9.8

Indiana
 Whiting Refinery (BP Products Inc by BP), Whiting, Nelson Complexity Index 9.73
 Mount Vernon Refinery (Countrymark Co-op), Mount Vernon,

Kansas
 Coffeyville Refinery (Coffeyville Resources by CVR Energy), Coffeyville,  Nelson Complexity Index 12.9
 El Dorado Refinery (HollyFrontier), El Dorado,  Nelson Complexity Index 11.8
 McPherson Refinery (CHS Inc.), McPherson,

Kentucky
 Catlettsburg Refinery (Marathon Petroleum Company), Catlettsburg, 
 Somerset Refinery (Continental Refining Company), Somerset,

Louisiana
 Alliance Refinery (Phillips 66), Belle Chasse,  Nelson Complexity Index 12.0. Closed 2021
 Baton Rouge Refinery (ExxonMobil), Baton Rouge, 
 Chalmette Refinery (PBF Energy), Chalmette,  Nelson Complexity Index 12.7
 Convent Refinery (Shell Oil Company), Convent,  Closed 2020 conversion into a low-carbon alternative energy facility considered.
 Cotton Valley Refinery (Calumet Specialty Products Partners), Cotton Valley, 
 Garyville Refinery (Marathon Petroleum Company), Garyville, 
 Krotz Springs Refinery (Delek), Krotz Springs, 
 Lake Charles Refinery (Calcasieu Refining), Lake Charles, 
 Lake Charles Refinery (Citgo), Lake Charles, 
 Lake Charles Refinery,(Pelican Refining), Lake Charles, 
 Lake Charles Refinery (Phillips 66), Westlake,  Nelson Complexity Index 11.2
 Meraux Refinery (Valero), Meraux, Nelson Complexity Index 9.7
 Norco Refinery (Shell Oil Company), Norco, 
 Port Allen Refinery (Placid Refining), Port Allen, 
 Princeton Refinery (Calumet Specialty Products Partners), Princeton, 
 Shreveport Refinery (Calumet Specialty Products Partners), Shreveport, 
 St. Charles Refinery (Valero), Norco, Nelson Complexity Index 16.0
 St. Rose Refinery (Shell Oil Company, St. Rose,

Michigan
 Marathon Detroit Refinery (Marathon Petroleum Company), Detroit,

Minnesota
 Pine Bend Refinery (Flint Hills Resources by Koch Industries), Rosemount, 
 St. Paul Park Refinery (Marathon Petroleum Company), St. Paul Park,  Nelson Complexity Index 11.5

Mississippi
 Pascagoula Refinery (Chevron), Pascagoula, 
 Vicksburg Refinery (Ergon), Vicksburg, 
 Rogerslacy Refinery (Hunt Southland Refining), Sandersville 
Greenville Refinery, Scott Petroleum, Biodiesel Oil Refinery

Montana
 Billings Refinery (Phillips 66), Billings, 
 Billings Refinery (ExxonMobil), Billings, 
 Calumet Montana Refining (Calumet Specialty Products Partners), Great Falls, 
 Laurel Refinery (CHS Inc.), Laurel,

Nevada
 Eagle Springs Refinery (Foreland Refining), Ely,

New Jersey
 Bayway Refinery (Phillips 66), Linden, 
 Eagle Point Refinery (Sunoco), Westville,  - closed in 2010
 Paulsboro Asphalt Refinery (Axeon) Paulsboro  - scheduled to close in 2017
 Paulsboro Refinery (PBF Energy) Paulsboro  Nelson Complexity Index 13.2
 Perth Amboy Refinery (Chevron), Perth Amboy   - closed in 2012
 Port Reading Refinery (Hess), Port Reading   - closed in 2013

New Mexico
 Navajo Refinery (HollyFrontier), Artesia,  Nelson Complexity Index 11.8
 Bloomfield Refinery (Western Refining), Bloomfield,  - closed 2012
 Ciniza Refinery (Marathon Petroleum Company), Gallup,  - closed 2020

North Dakota
 Mandan Refinery (Marathon Petroleum), Mandan, 
 Dickinson Renewables Facility (Marathon Petroleum), Dickinson,    converted to 15,000 barrels oilbbl/d renewable diesel plant

Ohio
 Canton Refinery (Marathon Petroleum), Canton, 
 Lima Refinery (Cenovus Energy), Lima, 
 Toledo Refinery (BP/Husky Energy), Toledo, Nelson Complexity Index 10.66
 Toledo Refinery (PBF) (PBF Energy) Toledo,  Nelson Complexity Index - 9.2

Oklahoma
 Ardmore Refinery (Valero), Ardmore, Nelson Complexity Index 12.1
 Ponca City Refinery (Phillips 66) Ponca City, 
 Tulsa Refinery East & West (HollyFrontier), Tulsa,  Nelson Complexity Index 14.0
 Wynnewood Refinery (Wynnewood Refining by CVR Energy) Wynnewood,  Nelson Complexity Index 9.3

Pennsylvania
 Bradford Refinery (American Refining Group), Bradford, 
 Marcus Hook Refinery (Sunoco), Marcus Hook,  - closed 2011
 Philadelphia Refinery (Philadelphia Energy Solutions by Carlyle Group), Philadelphia  - closed 6/2019
 Trainer Refinery (Monroe Energy by Delta Air Lines), Trainer, 
 Warren Refinery, United Refining Company, Warren, 
 Wamsutta Oil Refinery (historical), McClintocksville

Tennessee
 Memphis Refinery (Valero), Memphis , Nelson Complexity Index 7.9

Texas
 Baytown Refinery (ExxonMobil), Baytown, 
 Big Spring Refinery (Delek), Big Spring, 
 Beaumont Refinery (ExxonMobil), Beaumont, 
 Borger Refinery (WRB Refining LP by Phillips 66/Cenovus, Borger  Nelson Complexity Index 12.3
 Corpus Christi Complex (Flint Hills Resources), Corpus Christi, 
 Corpus Christi Refinery (Citgo), Corpus Christi, 
 Corpus Christi East & West Refinery (Valero), Corpus Christi, Nelson Complexity Index 15.4
 Deer Park Refinery (PEMEX), Deer Park, 
 El Paso Refinery (Marathon Petroleum), El Paso, 
 Galveston Bay Refinery (Marathon Petroleum), Texas City, 
 Houston Refinery (LyondellBasell), Houston, 
 Houston Refinery (Valero), Houston, Nelson Complexity Index 8.9
 Independent Refinery (Stratnor), Houston, 
 McKee Refinery (Valero), Sunray, Nelson Complexity Index 9.5
 Nixon Refinery (Blue Dolphin Energy Company) Nixon, 
 Pasadena Refining System (Chevron), Pasadena, 
 Port Arthur Refinery (Total), Port Arthur, 
 Port Arthur Refinery (Motiva Enterprises), Port Arthur, 
 Port Arthur Refinery (Valero), Port Arthur, Nelson Complexity Index 12.4
 San Antonio Refinery (Calumet Specialty Products Partners), San Antonio, 
 Sweeny Refinery (Phillips 66), Sweeny,  Nelson Complexity Index 13.2
 Texas City Refinery (Valero), Texas City Nelson Complexity Index 11.1, 
 Sullivan Three Rivers Refinery (Valero), Three Rivers, Nelson Complexity Index 13.2
 Tyler Refinery (Delek), Tyler,

Utah
 North Salt Lake Refinery (Big West Oil, a subsidiary of FJ Management), North Salt Lake, 
 Salt Lake City Refinery (Chevron), Salt Lake City, 
 Salt Lake City Refinery (Marathon Petroleum), Salt Lake City, 
 Woods Cross Refinery (HollyFrontier), Woods Cross,  Nelson Complexity Index 12.5
 Woods Cross Refinery (Silver Eagle Refining), Woods Cross,

Washington
 Puget Sound Refinery (HollyFrontier), Anacortes, 
 Marathon Anacortes Refinery (Marathon Petroleum), Anacortes, 
 Cherry Point Refinery (BP), Blaine, Nelson Complexity Index 9.59
 Ferndale Refinery (Phillips 66), Ferndale, 
 Tacoma Refinery (Par Pacific Holdings), Tacoma,

West Virginia
 Newell Refinery (Ergon), Newell,

Wisconsin
 Superior Refinery (Husky Energy), Superior,

Wyoming
 Cheyenne Refinery (HollyFrontier), Cheyenne, WY,  Nelson Complexity Index 8.9 Converted (2020)  in Renewable Diesel facility  
 Douglas Refinery (Genesis Energy), Douglas, WY, 
 Evanston Refinery (Silver Eagle Refining), Evanston, WY, 
 Newcastle Refinery (Wyoming Refining Company, LLC a subsidiary of Par Pacific Holdings), Newcastle, WY, 
 Sinclair Wyoming Refinery (Sinclair Oil), Sinclair, WY, 
 Sinclair Casper Refinery (Sinclair Oil), Evansville, WY,

US Virgin Islands
 St Croix Refinery (HOVENSA)  - closed in 2012
 BP Limetree has rebuilt and been licensed to operate refinery at

Oceania

Australia

New South Wales
 Kurnell Refinery (Caltex), Botany Bay - closed in 2014 and converted to a terminal
 Clyde Refinery (Shell Australia), Clyde - closed in 2012 and converted to a terminal
 Matraville Refinery (Total), Matraville - closed in 1985

Victoria
 Geelong Oil Refinery (Vitol, Viva Energy), Geelong
 Westernport Refinery (BP), Crib Point - closed in 1984

Queensland
 Bulwer Island Refinery (BP), Bulwer Island , Nelson Complexity Index 7.21 - closed in 2015 and converted to a jet fuel terminal
 Lytton Oil Refinery (Ampol), Lytton
 Eromanga Refinery (IOR Energy), Eromanga

South Australia
 Port Stanvac Refinery (ExxonMobil), Lonsdale - mothballed in 2003, closed in 2009

Western Australia
 Kwinana Oil Refinery (BP), Kwinana , Nelson Complexity Index 7.70 - closed in 2021 and converting to terminal

New Zealand
 Marsden Point Oil Refinery (Refining NZ), Whangarei  Nelson Complexity Index 8.12 - closing in 2022 and converting to terminal

Papua New Guinea
 InterOil Refinery, Port Moresby (Puma Energy),

South America

Argentina
 La Plata Refinery (YPF) 
 Buenos Aires Refinery (Royal Dutch Shell) 
 Luján de Cuyo Refinery (YPF) 
 Esso Campana Refinery (Axion Energy) 
 San Lorenzo Refinery (Refisan S.A.)  (start-up 1938)
 Plaza Huincul Refinery (YPF)  (start-up 1919)
 Campo Duran Refinery (Refinor) 
 Bahía Blanca Refinery (Petrobras) 
 Avellaneda Refinery (Destilerías Argentinas de Petróleos, DAPSA)

Bolivia
 Gualberto Villarael Cochabamba Refinery (YPFB) 
 Guillermo Elder Bell Santa Cruz Refinery (YPFB) 
 Carlos Montenegro Sucre Refinery (Refisur SA) 
 Reficruz 
 Refinería Oro Negro SA

Brazil
 REFAP (Petrobras), Canoas 
 RECAP (Petrobras), Mauá 
 REPLAN (Petrobras), Paulínia 
 REVAP (Petrobras), São José dos Campos  
 RPBC (Petrobras), Cubatão 
 REDUC (Petrobras), Duque de Caxias, Rio de Janeiro 
 REMAN (Petrobras), Manaus 
 Lubnor (Petrobras), Fortaleza 
 REGAP (Petrobras), Betim 
 REPAR (Petrobras), Araucária 
 RLAM (Petrobras), São Francisco do Conde 
 RPCC (Petrobras), Guamaré 
 RNEST (Petrobras), Ipojuca 
COMPERJ(Petrobras), Itaboraí - RJ - under construction
 Refinaria Ipiranga (Refinaria Riograndense), Pelotas 
 Refinaria Manguinhos (Grupo Peixoto de Castro ), Rio de Janeiro 
 DAX Oil (Dax-Oil), Camaçari 
 Univen (Univen Petróleo), Itupeva

Chile
 BioBio Refinery (Empresa Nacional del Petróleo), 
 Aconcagua Concon Refinery (Empresa Nacional del Petróleo), 
 Gregorio Refinery (Empresa Nacional del Petróleo),

Colombia
 Cartagena Refinery (Reficar S.A.),  (start-up 1957)
 Apiay Refinery (Ecopetrol), 
 Orito Refinery (Ecopetrol), 
 Tibu Refinery (Ecopetrol),

Ecuador
 Esmeraldas Refinery (Petroecuador),  (start-up 1978)
 La Libertad Refinery (Petroecuador), 
 Shushufindi Refinery (Petroecuador),

Paraguay
 Villa Elisa Refinery (Petropar)

Perú
 Refinería La Pampilla Ventanilla/Lima (Repsol) , 5 Mtpa
 Refinería de Talara (Petroperú)  (start-up 1917) with FCC unit
 Refinería Iquitos Loreto (Petroperú)  (start-up 1982)
 Refinería Conchan (Petroperú)  (start-up 1961)
 Refinería Pucallpa (Maple Gas) 
 Refinería El Milagro (Petroperú)  (start-up 1994)
 Refinería Shiviyacu (Pluspetrol)  (start-up 1950)

Suriname
 Staatsolie Refinery (Staatsolie)

Uruguay
 La Teja Montevideo Refinery (ANCAP)  (start-up 1937)

Venezuela
 Paraguana Refinery Complex (CRP) (PDVSA)  (Amuay-Cardón-Bajo Grande) (start-up 1997)
 Amuay Refinery (CRP) (PDVSA)  (start-up 1950)
 Cardón Refinery (CRP) (PDVSA)  (start-up 1949)
 Bajo Grande Refinery (CRP) (PDVSA)  (start-up 1956)
 Puerto La Cruz Refinery (PDVSA)  (start-up 1948)
 El Palito Refinery (PDVSA)  (start-up 1954)
 San Roque Refinery (PDVSA) 
 Upgraders (Extra Heavy Oil Joint Ventures with PDVSA at Jose)
 Petro San Felix, originally Petrozuata (PDVSA)  (start-up 2000)
 Petropiar (PDVSA and Chevron), originally Ameriven  (Phillips 66, Texaco and PDVSA)  (start-up 2004)
Petrocedeño, originally Sincor (TotalEnergies, Equinor (prev. Statoil), and PDVSA)  (start-up 2001)
 Petromonagas (PDVSA, Rosneft), originally Cerro Negro (ExxonMobil, Aral AG, and PDVSA)  (start-up 2001)

See also
 List of oil pipelines
 List of natural gas pipelines
 List of oil refineries in India

References

External links
 Energy Information Administration: Petroleum Refining and Processing Data
 Information About Asiste Pemex Login and refineries
 EIA: U.S. Directory of Operable Petroleum Refineries
 Google Earth Community Placemark

Lists by country
Energy-related lists